Jonathan Christian David (born January 14, 2000) is a Canadian professional soccer player who plays as a forward for Ligue 1 club Lille. Born in the United States to Haitian parents, David was raised in Ottawa, Ontario, and represents the Canada national team.

David was born in New York City, but moved to Haiti when he was still a baby, and immigrated to Ottawa, Canada at the age of six. Raised in the Franco-Ontarian community of east-Ottawa, he played for several local youth clubs before moving to Belgium in 2018, where he recorded his professional debut for Gent. Two years later he joined French side Lille, where he aided in winning one Ligue 1 title and one Trophée des Champions. In 2019, David was named the male Canada Soccer Player of the Year.

Early life 
David was born in New York City to Haitian parents, and moved to Port-au-Prince when he was three months old. At the age of six, he and his parents emigrated from Haiti to Canada and settled in Ottawa. Growing up, David went to the Francophone public school École secondaire publique Louis-Riel. He cites this as a reason for his success: "It helped to always have the ball at my feet when I was at Louis Riel."

David began playing organised soccer at age ten with Ottawa club Gloucester Dragons SA. A year later he joined Ottawa Gloucester SC, where he played for the club's Hornets team until 2015. In 2016, he joined Ottawa Internationals SC.
Growing up, David watched European soccer but not Major League Soccer as he had no desire to play professionally in North America. Instead, he was singularly focused on playing professionally in Europe. He credits youth coach Hanny El-Magraby with being an early mentor and father figure who helped him achieve his dream of playing professional football in Europe. Before signing with Gent, David had trials at FC Salzburg and VfB Stuttgart, but was rejected by both.

Club career

Gent
In January 2018, David joined Belgian First Division A side Gent. He made his professional debut on August 4, 2018, against Zulte Waregem and scored a goal in stoppage time to salvage a 1–1 draw. Just five days after his league debut, David came in as a second-half substitute in a Europa League Third Round Qualifier against Jagiellonia Białystok, scoring a goal in the 85th minute to secure a 1–0 win for his team. David continued his scoring streak three days later, coming in as a 71st minute substitute and scoring two late goals to secure a 4–1 league win against Waasland-Beveren. After scoring five goals in his first five games, Gent signed David to a contract extension through 2022. He further extended his contract by a year to 2023 in September 2019. In the January 2020 transfer window, Gent chairman Ivan de Witte indicated there was significant interest in David from bigger clubs, with his value estimated at €20 million.

Lille

2020–21 season: Ligue 1 champions

On August 11, 2020, Ligue 1 side Lille confirmed the signing of David on a five-year contract. The reported fee for David was €30 million, making him the most expensive Canadian transfer to date. He made his competitive debut for Lille on August 22 against Rennes in their Ligue 1 season opener. After a difficult start to the season, David scored his first goal for Lille on November 22 against Lorient, netting the final goal in a 4–0 victory.

After going scoreless in his previous seven games, David netted an extra-time winner against Reims to even Lille on points with Paris Saint-Germain (PSG) at the top of the table. On February 3, 2021, David scored as Lille defeated Bordeaux by a score of 3–0. Continuing his run of form, David netted his first career Ligue 1 brace, scoring two goals on February 7 against Nantes. After only scoring two goals during the first half of the 2020–21 campaign, this brace marked David's fifth goal in as many games. On April 3, he scored the winning goal in a 1–0 away win over PSG, to be Lille's first away league win over the Parisians since April 1996.

On May 23, he scored a goal in a 2–1 away win over Angers to win the 2020–21 Ligue 1 with Lille. David finished his first season with 13 league goals, with 11 coming since the turn of the year. This included the winner against PSG in a closely contested match at the Parc des Princes and a late double against Marseille, becoming an important player for Lille's title charge and one of the league's most in-form players.

International career

Youth
David was first identified by the Canadian youth national team program in 2015 after attending several under-15 camps and was regularly called up to Canada under-17 camps in the lead-up to the 2017 CONCACAF U-17 Championship. David subsequently represented Canada at the tournament and scored a brace against Suriname in the final group game. In May 2018, David was called up to the Canadian Under-21 team for the 2018 Toulon Tournament.

David received a call-up to the United States under-20 team by Tab Ramos in 2018. He declined the invitation to focus on his club career, and because his desire was to represent Canada.

Senior

David received his first senior call up to Canada on August 30, 2018, for a CONCACAF Nations League qualifier against the U.S. Virgin Islands. He made his senior debut in the match on September 9, starting and netting a brace in an 8–0 victory. David was named to the final squad for the 2019 CONCACAF Gold Cup on May 30, 2019. In Canada's final group game during the tournament against Cuba, he scored a hat-trick in a 7–0 win. Despite Canada's elimination to Haiti in the quarter-finals, David would finish the tournament as the Golden Boot winner with six goals.

After Canada's 6–0 victory over Cuba on September 7, 2019, David set the record for most Canada senior international goals in a single year with eight in 2019. For his efforts, he was named the 2019 Canadian Men's Player of the Year.

On June 8, 2021, David scored his second hat-trick for Canada in a 4–0 win over Suriname in a 2022 World Cup qualification match. At the end of the 2022 FIFA World Cup qualification campaign, David tallied a total of nine goals, five of them coming from the third and final round. In November 2022, he was confirmed as part of the 26-man squad going to the 2022 FIFA World Cup.

Style of play
A versatile forward, David plays primarily as a second striker in a 4–4–2 formation or as an attacking midfielder; he is also capable of playing as an out–and–out striker, and is known for his goalscoring ability. As a second striker, in a partnership he plays just behind the other primary striker. David is able to find gaps in the defence and to attack these areas with his pace, noted for his high top speeds. He is also able to play short passes and combine with teammates to attack the goal area, he is able to play best with his tight control and sharp interplay between teammates. Due to his pace and speed, David is also effective on counterattacks. Moreover, he is known for his tactical intelligence, defensive work-rate, and ability to read the game, as well as his willingness to press opposing players off the ball.

Career statistics

Club

International

Scores and results list Canada's goal tally first, score column indicates score after each David goal.

Honours
Lille
Ligue 1: 2020–21
Trophée des Champions: 2021

Individual
CONCACAF Gold Cup Best XI: 2019
CONCACAF Gold Cup Golden Boot: 2019
Belgian First Division A Top Scorer: 2019–20 (shared with Dieumerci Mbokani)
Canadian Men's Player of the Year: 2019
 Jean-Claude Bouvy Trophy: 2019–20

References

External links

 
 
 

2000 births
Living people
Association football forwards
Canadian soccer players
Sportspeople from Brooklyn
Soccer players from New York City
Sportspeople from Port-au-Prince
Soccer players from Ottawa
American soccer players
American sportspeople of Haitian descent
American emigrants to Canada
Black Canadian soccer players
Canadian sportspeople of Haitian descent
Naturalized citizens of Canada
Canadian expatriate soccer players
Expatriate footballers in Belgium
Expatriate footballers in France
Canadian expatriate sportspeople in Belgium
Canadian expatriate sportspeople in France
K.A.A. Gent players
Lille OSC players
Belgian Pro League players
Canada men's youth international soccer players
Canada men's international soccer players
2019 CONCACAF Gold Cup players
2022 FIFA World Cup players